Chester Greenwood (4 December 1858 – 5 July 1937) was an American engineer and inventor, known for inventing the earmuffs in 1873.  He reportedly came up with the idea while ice skating and he asked his grandmother to sew tufts of fur between loops of wire.  His patent was for improved ear protectors.  He manufactured these ear protectors, providing jobs for people in the Farmington area for nearly 60 years.

Career 
In 1873, aged 15, while he was testing a new pair of [ice skates], he got frustrated as he tried to protect his ears from the cold. He then wrapped his head with a scarf, but was too itchy to wear. Later, he designed two ear-shaped loops made by wire. He then asked his grandmother to sew fur on the loops. It successfully kept the cold away from his ears. He later improved the prototype earmuffs using a steel band which held them in place, and he named these earmuffs "Greenwood's Champion Ear Protectors". He saw the world as a better place when he created the Earmuff's

Greenwood also patented a tea kettle, a variation of the steel-toothed rake, an advertising matchbox, and a machine used to produce wooden spools for wire and thread.  He invented, but did not patent, an umbrella holder for mail carriers. The total number of patents Greenwood held seems to be contested: Some claim only a handful, while others claim over 100. The memory of the latter helps boost Greenwood's historical legacy.

In addition to being an inventor, Greenwood was the owner of a bicycle business and a business involving an improved heating system. He also introduced one of the first telephone systems in Farmington. He was an accomplished machinist, an active member of the community, a business developer, a member of the Unitarian Church and a family man.  His wife, Isabel (née Whittier), was a supporter of woman suffrage. He and Isabel were parents of four children.

Chester Greenwood Day 

In 1977, the State of Maine declared December 21 to be Chester Greenwood Day.  Farmington continues to celebrate "Chester Greenwood Day" with a parade on the first Saturday of December.

The Chester Greenwood House in Farmington is listed on the National Register of Historic Places.

References 

19th-century American inventors
1858 births
1937 deaths
People from Farmington, Maine